Fritz Scheller (22 September 1914 – 22 July 1997) was a German cyclist. He competed in the individual and team road race events at the 1936 Summer Olympics.

References

External links
 

1914 births
1997 deaths
German male cyclists
Olympic cyclists of Germany
Cyclists at the 1936 Summer Olympics
Sportspeople from Erlangen
Cyclists from Bavaria
20th-century German people